CSNY 1974 is the nineteenth album by Crosby, Stills, & Nash, their seventh in the CSNY quartet configuration, and their fifth live album, the third as a foursome. Issued on Rhino Records in 2014, it consists of concert material recorded in 1974 on the band's tour during the summer of that year. It was issued in several formats: a standard compact disc box set consisting of three audio discs and a standard DVD; as one pure audio Blu-ray disc and a Blu-ray DVD; and a more expensively packaged limited deluxe edition consisting of the material on six vinyl records along with the Blu-ray discs and a coffee table book. Three single disc samplers were also issued: one of the acoustic material exclusively available at Starbucks in the United States and Canada; a second at normal retail outlets; and a third included as a covermount disc to the 250th anniversary issue of the UK music magazine Mojo issued as "an exclusive audio-visual sampler of the new CSNY 1974 box set." Each of the non-sampler sets also contained a 188-page booklet, and all formats were released the same day, with the Mojo sampler arriving with the September 2014 publication of that edition. The three-disc and DVD package peaked at No. 17 on the Billboard 200, while the Starbucks sampler peaked at No. 37 and the selections sampler at No. 81.

Background
After the split of CSNY in the summer of 1970, through 1971 David Crosby, Graham Nash, and Neil Young released solo albums, while Stephen Stills issued two. All were gold records, as were the three issued in early 1972 by the quartet: Harvest; Graham Nash David Crosby; and Manassas; proving the group to be appealing commercially apart as well as together. Indicative of this commercial clout, only the separated Beatles as a group also achieved gold records with regularity during the same time period, reinforcing the notion of CSNY as the American Beatles. The foursome showed little interest in regrouping given their individual success, but with the Beatles defunct and Bob Dylan not touring, public enthusiasm remained unabated for CSNY as the new counterculture leaders to record and/or do concerts together, acknowledged by manager Elliot Roberts with his 'pissing in the wind' quote.

Young toured solo in late 1970 and early 1971, and Stills undertook his first solo headlining tour with a new band in the summer of 1971, about the same time as Crosby and Nash toured 'unplugged', for the first time as a duo. Crosby and Nash toured by themselves again in 1972, while Stills assembled his Manassas band to tour after their album. There had been sporadic reunions, with Young showing up to Crosby and Nash shows, Young recording a one-off single "War Song" with Nash, and CSN in three different pairs providing backing vocals on Young's Harvest album.

In 1973, their individual fortunes began to falter. Stills toured again with Manassas, but their second album did not do as well in the marketplace. Young undertook two tours colored by the death of Crazy Horse guitarist Danny Whitten; the album from the first tour (with Crosby and Nash on a couple of tracks) Time Fades Away falling well short of the previous year's Harvest sales-wise; his very dark Tonight's the Night album had been delayed by the record company. Crosby's reunion with the Byrds and Nash's second solo album also did not do very well critically or commercially. An attempt to make the second CSNY studio album in the summer of 1973 after a reunion in Hawaii fell apart.

Crosby and Nash put together their first electric band tour in late 1973, and Stills continued to tour with Manassas late into 1973, but the seed had been planted. In January and February 1974, impresario Bill Graham successfully directed the return of Bob Dylan to the concert stage with a winter tour of basketball and hockey arenas. Manager Roberts proposed to CSNY something more ambitious: a summer tour of baseball and football stadiums. Crosby, Stills, Nash, and Young agreed, Graham signed on as tour director, and the tour was set to begin in July. Rehearsals took place at Young's ranch in La Honda in May and June.

Tour

Besides the four principals on guitars and keyboards, supporting musicians had previously worked with different members. Tim Drummond had been the bassist for Young's Stray Gators band and had recently played on Wild Tales by Nash and On the Beach by Young. Drummer Russ Kunkel appeared on the debut album by Crosby & Nash, and percussionist Joe Lala was a member of Stills's Manassas.

The tour commenced on July 9 at the Seattle Center Coliseum. Attendees were treated to a concert of exceptional length: the band was still playing past 2:00am.  Following performances included 30 dates in 23 locations, ending the North American tour proper at the Roosevelt Raceway in Westbury, New York on September 8. A 32nd and final show took place on September 14 at Wembley Stadium, with opening acts including The Band and Joni Mitchell. The Beach Boys, Santana, Joe Walsh, and Jesse Colin Young also appeared as support acts during the tour.

Cass Elliot died in London during the tour on July 29. Nash relayed the news to Kunkel, who was married to her sister Leah. Kunkel said, "She had a big role in their lives. She introduced Graham to Stephen. It was a very difficult day for us when she died. Thank God we were in the middle of doing something we couldn’t stop. The show that night is probably what got us all through it."

Although large multiple-bill festivals such as Miami Pop, Woodstock, and Watkins Glen had taken place, and CSNY, the Rolling Stones, and others had played infrequent stadium shows, no band except for the Beatles had ever attempted a tour of this magnitude. Whereas the Beatles had done a series of stadium dates over two weeks in 1966, the scope of this tour and its logistics were unprecedented; the tour visited indoor sports arenas, race tracks, and smaller college stadia, including Chicago Stadium, Nassau Coliseum, Boston Garden, the Capital Centre, Jeppesen Stadium at the University of Houston, and the St. Paul Civic Center.

Production and box set content
Nash and Joel Bernstein, who had assembled the three individual box sets Voyage, Reflections, and Carry On for Crosby, Nash, and Stills respectively, collaborated again to produce this set. Nash stated that he became the group's archivist both because of his interest in preserving their history and because "I just think I'm the only one with the patience for it." Nash had also produced the 1991 box set for CSN, and Bernstein was the photographer for the 1974 tour. Nash and Bernstein selected the best take for each song from the dozen or so performances available. Nash claimed there were absolutely no overdubs: "If something was out of tune, I would either tune or I'd find it from another show – I'd find something at roughly the same tempo and I'd put it on." The commitment to not overdubbing any tracks led to his decision to not include one of Stills' best known songs, "Carry On", as a good take could not be assembled even by splicing songs together.

Recording locations during the tour as per the dates below were the Nassau Coliseum in Uniondale, New York; the Capital Centre in Landover, Maryland; Chicago Stadium in Chicago; and Wembley Stadium in London, England. Additional recording after the tour took place at a benefit for the United Farm Workers on December 14 at the San Francisco Civic Auditorium. The concerts in Landover and London were filmed and provide the video footage for the DVD.

While the set list consisted of material taken from both group and solo projects, many songs performed on the tour and included in the box set had not been issued before the tour. Some of these tracks may have been intended for the aborted Human Highway CSNY project of the previous summer. "Carry Me" and "Time After Time" by Crosby would show up respectively on the Crosby & Nash albums Wind on the Water and Whistling Down the Wire. "Myth of Sisyphus" and "My Angel" by Stills would appear on his next solo album. "Fieldworker" by Nash would also be included on Wind on the Water. "Mellow My Mind" by Young would be released on Tonight's the Night, and "Long May You Run" would be the title track for the album Young would record with Stills. "On the Beach" and "Revolution Blues" would be released during the tour via Young's On the Beach. CSN's cover of "Blackbird" had been recorded in the studio in early 1969, but would not be issued until the 1991 box set. Five songs by Young – "Traces", "Goodbye Dick", "Love Art Blues", "Hawaiian Sunrise", and "Pushed It Over the End" – had appeared on bootlegs and imports but never on an officially sanctioned release.

The box set presents an idealized concert from the template of the shows themselves: discs one and three are full-band electric sets flanking a middle second set of acoustic songs in solo, duo, trio, and quartet configurations. The 188-page booklet contains photographs, an essay, quotes, and song information compiled by Bernstein, including which instruments were used on each song. Crosby had wanted to title the acoustic set "What Could Possibly Go Wrong?", but that was nixed by the others.

Legacy
Crosby dubbed this "the Doom Tour," in reference to both the difficulties in playing such large venues and the collateral excesses. To have something in the stores coinciding with the tour, Atlantic Records compiled So Far from two studio albums and both sides of the stand-alone "Ohio" single. Nash found this absurd; nevertheless the album topped the Billboard 200, and its cover drawing by Joni Mitchell would appear on everything from dinner plates to pillowcases as part of the group's travel accessories. Cocaine was also another of the tour's accessories, and tales of the group's behavior have been well chronicled. The tour gross was approximately $11 million (57.6 million in 2020 dollars); however, with a tour staff of 86 and the various extravagances, Crosby maintains that the four principals took home a surprisingly small percentage of the proceeds.

The first stadium tour, CSNY in 1974 set the precedent for every similar outing to follow. Bill Graham would work in the same capacity for the Rolling Stones on their American tours of 1975, 1978, and 1981, adding more stadium dates with each subsequent excursion. As lucrative stadium tours with their large attendances became more feasible during the 1970s, so documents of the tour such as Frampton Comes Alive! and Kiss Alive II became equally more lucrative. The promotion business of rock and popular music has not looked back since.

In the autumn after the tour, another attempt to record a new CSNY studio album in Sausalito came to naught. There would be yet another aborted attempt during the sessions for Long May You Run, but it would also end in acrimony. The next time they completed a group album, it would be the trio and not the quartet for CSN in 1977.

Track listing

Disc one

Disc two

Disc three

DVD

Single disc sampler
Audience noise was trimmed from tracks to ensure that they all fit on a single compact disc.

Starbucks sampler

Mojo disc sampler

Recording dates and locations

8/14 Nassau Coliseum Uniondale NY
"Goodbye Dick"
"Mellow My Mind"

8/15 Nassau Coliseum Uniondale NY
"Suite Judy Blue Eyes"
"Long Time Gone"

8/19 Capital Centre Landover MD
"Change Partners"
"Pre-Road Downs"
"Wooden Ships"

8/20 Capital Centre Landover MD
"Only Love Can Break Your Heart"
"Fieldworker"
"Long May You Run"

8/21 Capital Centre Landover MD
"Love the One You're With"
"Immigration Man"
"Traces"
"Grave Concern"
"Almost Cut My Hair"
"Prison Song"
"Teach Your Children"
"Deja Vu"
"Military Madness"

8/27 Chicago Stadium
"My Angel"
"Don't Be Denied"
"Revolution Blues"
"Ohio"

8/28 Chicago Stadium
"Helpless"
"Johnny's Garden"
"On the Beach"

8/29 Chicago Stadium
"Carry Me"
"Black Queen"
"The Lee Shore"
"Time After Time"
"Old Man"
"Love Art Blues"
"Hawaiian Sunrise"
"Chicago"

9/14 Wembley Stadium
""Our House"
"Pushed It Over the End"

12/14 SF Civic Auditorium
"Guinnevere"

Personnel
 David Crosby — vocals, guitars, tambourine
 Stephen Stills — vocals, guitars, keyboards, acoustic bass guitar
 Graham Nash — vocals, keyboards, guitars, harmonica
 Neil Young — vocals, guitars, keyboards, harmonica, banjo guitar
 Tim Drummond — electric bass guitar
 Russ Kunkel — drums
 Joe Lala — percussion

Production personnel
 Graham Nash and Joel Bernstein along with Crosby, Stills, Nash & Young — producers
 Elliot Mazer, Stephen Barncard — recording engineers
 Stanley Johnston – analog-to-digital transfer and digital audio processing
 Stanley Johnston, Graham Nash, Joel Bernstein – mixing
 Bernie Grundman, Stanley Johnston – mastering
 Brian Porizek – art direction and design

Tour personnel
 Bill Graham — tour director
 Elliot Roberts, Leslie Morris, Michael John Bowen – artist management
 Chris O'Dell — tour manager
 Tim Mulligan – house sound engineer
 Barry Imhoff – head of production
 Frank Barsalona — booking agent
 Joel Bernstein – tour photographer
 Patrick Stansfield – stage manager
 Steven Cohen – lighting director
 Steve Gagne – chief audio engineer
 Jay Jones, Fred Meyers, Mark Morris, Steve Neal, Craig Reynolds – audio technicians
 Guillermo Giachetti, Glenn Goodwin, John Talbot – equipment managers
 Ben Lesko – guitar technician

Charts

Weekly charts

Year-end charts

Tour dates

Notes

References

Bibliography

Crosby, Stills, Nash & Young live albums
2014 live albums
Rhino Records live albums